Wat Phrachao Ong Dam ("Temple of the Black-Bodied Lord") is a ruined temple that is part of the Wiang Kum Kam archaeological site which is located just outside the northern Thai city of Chiang Mai in Chiang Mai province.

The ruined temple is named after a burnt bronze Buddha image that was discovered there.

It is located very close to the north-western side of Wat Phaya Mangrai, another ruined temple located in the area.

See also
Wat Phaya Mangrai
Wiang Kum Kam

References

 Oliver Hargreave: Exploring Chiang Mai, City, Valley & Mountains. Within Books, 4th Edition, 2013. 

Phrachao Ong Dam